{{Infobox clergy
| name        = Donald Foster Hudson
| image       =
| image_size  = 
| caption     =
| birth_date  = <ref name="Hudson">John Hudson, Donald Foster HUDSON 1916-2003 [Heath 1927-1935].  </ref>
| birth_place = Halifax, West Riding of Yorkshire, England
| death_date  = 
| death_place = England
| church      =BMS World Mission
| other_names =D. F. Hudson
| education   = Regent's Park College, Oxford, Oxford University, M.A.| ordained    =6 July 1940
| writings    =See Section| congregations =West Bradford Baptist Fellowship and the Central Bradford Baptist Fellowship.
| offices_held =Lecturer of New Testament, Serampore College, Serampore
| title       = Reverend Doctor
| footnotes   = 
}}
Donald Foster Hudson (1916–2003) was a British missionary in India and the author of Teach Yourself New Testament Greek''.

History
Hudson was born in Halifax, West Riding of Yorkshire, England on 29 April 1916 to John and Kate.  He was enlisted for overseas missionary work with the BMS World Mission and was sent for theological studies to the Regent's Park College, Oxford.  He became ordained as a Baptist minister on 6 July 1940 and sailed for India the same year.

Hudson first served as a Missionary in Burma and later became Lecturer in New Testament at Serampore College (the only constituent College of the Senate of Serampore College}) from 1941 to 1964 along with M. P. John, his colleague who joined the college in 1947. Hudson and John tutored K. David, then pursuing postgraduate studies in Serampore College.

In 1964 Hudson left India and was involved in pastoral roles in England among the Baptist fraternity.  In 1997 he received Maundy money  from Queen Elizabeth II in Bradford Cathedral, West Yorkshire, England. He was a member of the Society for Biblical Studies in India.

Writings
Books
 Teach Yourself New Testament Greek
 Teach Yourself Bengali
 The Life and Letters of Saint Paul

Articles
 Diakonia and its Cognates in the New Testament
 A Further Note on Philippians 2:6-11

References
Notes

Further reading
 
 

1916 births
Baptist missionaries in India
Translators of the Bible into English
Scholars of Koine Greek
Alumni of Regent's Park College, Oxford
20th-century English Baptist ministers
English Baptist theologians
Baptist writers
2003 deaths
People from Halifax, West Yorkshire
20th-century translators
Senate of Serampore College (University) alumni
Academic staff of the Senate of Serampore College (University)
Missionary linguists